|}

The Two-Year-Old Trophy is a Listed flat horse race in Great Britain open to horses aged two years only.
It is run at Redcar over a distance of 5 furlongs and 217 yards (1,204 metres), and it is scheduled to take place each year in early October.

The race was first run in 1993.

Winners

See also
 Horse racing in Great Britain
 List of British flat horse races

References 
Racing Post: 

Flat races in Great Britain
Redcar Racecourse
Flat horse races for two-year-olds
Recurring sporting events established in 1993
1993 establishments in England